The Islamabad Accord was a peace and power-sharing agreement signed on 7 March 1993 between the warring parties in the War in Afghanistan (1992–1996), one party being the Islamic State of Afghanistan and the other an alliance of militias led by Gulbuddin Hekmatyar. The Defense Minister of Afghanistan, Ahmad Shah Massoud, resigned his position in exchange for peace, as requested by Hekmatyar who saw Massoud as a personal rival. Hekmatyar took the long-offered position of prime minister. The agreement proved short-lived, however, as Gulbuddin Hekmatyar and his allies soon resumed the bombardment of Kabul.

Text of the Islamabad Accord
An excerpt from the text of the Islamabad Accord as provided by the University of Ulster:

Aftermath
The Defense Minister of Afghanistan, Ahmad Shah Massoud, resigned his position in exchange for peace, as requested by Hekmatyar who saw Massoud as a personal rival. Burhanuddin Rabbani, belonging to the same party as Massoud, remained president while Gulbuddin Hekmatyar took the long-offered position of prime minister.

Only two days after the Islamabad Accord was put into effect, however, Hekmatyar's allies of Hezb-e Wahdat were again rocketing areas in Kabul. Both the Wahhabi Pashtun Ittehad-i Islami of Abdul Rasul Sayyaf backed by Saudi Arabia and the Shia Hazara Hezb-e Wahdat supported by Iran remained involved in heavy fighting against each other. Hekmatyar proved afraid to enter Kabul proper, chairing only one cabinet meeting. Pulitzer Prize-winning author Roy Gutman of the United States Institute of Peace wrote in How We Missed the Story: Osama bin Laden, the Taliban, and the Hijacking of Afghanistan:
Hekmatyar, who was generally opposed to coalition government but strived for undisputed power, had disputes with other parties over the selection of cabinet members and again launched major attacks against Kabul for one month. The President, Burhanuddin Rabbani, was attacked when he attempted to meet Hekmatyar. Massoud resumed his responsibilities as minister of defence consolidating his control over regions north of Kabul while another of Rabbani's senior commanders Ismail Khan allied to local Pashtuns was able to drive Hekmatyar's people from parts of Helmand province.
 
In May 1993, a new attempt was made to reinstate the Islamabad Accord. In August, Massoud again extended a hand to Hekmatyar in an attempt to broaden the government. By the end of 1993, however, Gulbuddin Hekmatyar and former communist general and militia leader, Abdul Rashid Dostum, were involved in secret negotiations encouraged by Pakistan's Inter-Services Intelligence, Iran's intelligence service and Uzbekistan's Karimov administration. They planned a coup to oust the Rabbani administration and to attack Massoud in his northern areas.

In January 1994, Hekmatyar and Dostum mounted a destructive bombardment campaign against the capital and attacked Massoud's core areas in the northeast. The attacks conducted by Hekmatyar and Dostum killed ten thousand civilians according to some estimates and 25,000 civilians according other estimates. Dostum's spokesperson (Uzbek) claimed Rabbani was running the country only in accord with Tajik interests. But Amin Saikal, Director of the Centre for Arab and Islamic Studies at the Australian National University, writes Hekmatyar had the following objectives in all his operations including this attempted coup: "The first was to make sure that Rabbani and Massoud were not allowed to consolidate power, build a credible administration, or expand their territorial control, so that the country would remain divided into small fiefdoms, run by various Muajhideen leaders and local warlords or a council of such elements, with only some of them allied to Kabul. The second was to ensure the Rabbani government acquired no capacity to dispense patronage, and to dissuade the Kabul population from giving more than limited support to the government. The third was to make Kabul an unsafe city for representatives of the international community and to prevent the Rabbani government from attracting the international support needed to begin the post-war reconstruction of Afghanistan and generate a level of economic activity which would enhance its credibility and popularity." Gulbuddin Hekmatyar received extensive support by neighbouring Pakistan.

By mid-1994, Hekmatyar and Dostum were on the defensive in Kabul against Islamic State forces led by Massoud. By early 1995, the Islamic State had been able to secure the capital. 
It began to restore some law and order, and to start basic public services. Massoud initiated a nationwide political process with the goal of national consolidation and democratic elections. But the Taliban, which had emerged over the course of 1994 in southern Afghanistan, were already at the doors of the capital city.

See also 
Islamic State of Afghanistan

References

Islamabad
Government of Benazir Bhutto
Afghanistan–Pakistan relations
Afghan Civil War (1992–1996)